The 2015–16 South Dakota Coyotes men's basketball team represented the University of South Dakota during the 2015–16 NCAA Division I men's basketball season. The Coyotes, led by second year head coach Craig Smith, played their home games at the DakotaDome and were members of The Summit League. They finished the season 14–18, 5–11 in Summit League play to finish in eighth play. They lost in the quarterfinals of The Summit League tournament to IPFW.

This was the Coyotes' final season at the DakotaDome; the team moved into the new Sanford Coyote Sports Center for the 2016–17 season.

Roster

Schedule

|-
!colspan=9 style="background:#E34234; color:#FFFFFF;"| Regular season

|-
!colspan=9 style="background:#E34234; color:#FFFFFF;"| The Summit League tournament

References

South Dakota Coyotes men's basketball seasons
South Dakota
Coyo
Coyo